Jardim da Luz (also: Praça da Luz or Parque da Luz) is a public park near the Luz station and Avenida Tiradentes in the Bom Retiro district of São Paulo. The headquarters of the Pinacoteca do Estado de São Paulo is located in the southeastern corner of the park.

History 
Originally created in 1798 as a botanical garden, the garden was transformed into a public park only in 1938, initially only serving as a big pasture for cattle and cows.

In 1900 was inaugurated the headquarters of Liceu de Artes e Ofícios de São Paulo, a building that nowadays holds the Pinacoteca do Estado.

During a big part of the 20th century, Jardim da Luz passed through a period of severe degradation, serving as a zone of prostitution and drug trafficking. The state government has since revitalized the central region of the city through a series of reforms, including installation of sculptures in the park, a remodel of the Pinacoteca do Estado, and increased police supervision of the area.

Sculptures

References 

Parks in São Paulo
Protected areas of São Paulo (state)